Tiangong International Limited is a privately owned company engaging in the production and sales of high speed steel (HSS) and its products in China. It is the largest steel tools maker in China.

It was established in 1984 in Danyang, Jiangsu and was listed on the Hong Kong Stock Exchange in 2007.

References

External links
Tiangong International Limited

Steel companies of China
Companies based in Jiangsu
Companies listed on the Hong Kong Stock Exchange
Manufacturing companies established in 1984
1984 establishments in China